John Henry Davies, known as Jack Davies, was employed by Wolverhampton Wanderers Football Club as assistant trainer in 1920. In 1930 he was promoted to first team trainer where he served under Major Frank Buckley.
During his 16 years as first team trainer at Wolves, the club went from the Second Division to narrowly missing out on the First Division Championship title in the 1937- 38, 1938-39 seasons and were FA Cup runners up in 1939. Over this period Wolverhampton Wanderers became one of the best teams in England. Jack persuaded the Wolves board to keep a young Stan Cullis, who in later years as a manager reigned over the club’s most successful period. Jack also persuaded Major Buckley not to release Billy Wright, who the club had deemed too short in height to make the grade as a professional footballer. Billy Wright went on to win three Football League championships and the FA Cup, whilst amassing 105 international caps for England. In later years Jack worked at the club as the Central League trainer, youth team trainer and then finally dressing room attendant for the club, until 1978.

Career honours

Wolverhampton Wanderers

First Division
•Runners-up: 1937-38, 1938-39

Second Division
•Champions: 1931-32

FA Cup
•Runners-up: 1939

Football League War Cup (Northern)
•Winners: 1941-42

Central League
•Champions: 1950-51, 1951-52, 1952-53

FA Youth Cup
•Winner: 1958
•Runners-up:1953, 1954 

Giller, Norman (2003) Billy Wright: A Hero for All Seasons,  - page 22.

References

Year of birth missing
Year of death missing
Wolverhampton Wanderers F.C. non-playing staff